Oreana may refer to:
 Oreana (moth), a genus of moth
 Oreana, Idaho
 Oreana, Illinois
 Oreana, Nevada
 Oreana Peak, in Nevada

See also 
 Oriana (disambiguation)